NORCON Northeastern Society of Constructions S/A  is  one of biggest Brazilian homebuilder and real estate  company. The company was founded in 1958, and is headquartered in Aracaju Sergipe. The company is owned by Brazilian Eng.Luiz Antonio Mesquita Teixeira & Economist Tarcisio Mesquita Teixeira.

References 

Real estate companies of Brazil
Construction and civil engineering companies of Brazil
Construction and civil engineering companies established in 1958
Real estate companies established in 1958
Brazilian companies established in 1958